Indera Kayangan is a state constituency in Perlis, Malaysia, that has been represented in the Perlis State Legislative Assembly since 1986.

The state constituency was created in 1984. It was first contested in 1986 and is mandated to return a single Assemblyman to the Perlis State Legislative Assembly under the first-past-the-post voting system. , the State Assemblyman for Indera Kayangan is Gan Ay Ling from Pakatan Harapan (PH). She is the only MLA to not be from the Perikatan Nasional party, which won every other seat in the Perlis state election.

Definition

Polling districts 
According to the federal gazette issued on 31 October 2022, the Indera Kayangan constituency is divided into 7 polling districts.

Demographics

History

Election results

References

Perlis state constituencies